Daron Beneby (born 4 May 1984) is a Bahamian international soccer player, who plays as a midfielder for the Bahamas national team. He also is vice president of the Bears Football Club.

International career
He made his international debut for Bahamas in a September 2006 Caribbean Cup qualification match against the Cayman Islands and has earned a total of 8 caps, scoring no goals. He has represented his country in 4 FIFA World Cup qualification matches.

He also plays for the national beach soccer team and earned a coaching license in 2014.

References

External links

1984 births
Living people
Association football central defenders
Bahamian footballers
Bahamas international footballers
Bears FC players